The  is an annual science fiction convention held in Japan. TOKON (when it is held in Tokyo) or DAICON (when it is held in Osaka).

Each year the Nihon SF Taikai attracts between 1,000 and 1,500 science fiction fans. Events at the convention include panel discussions, lectures, readings, screenings, parties, games, concerts, and a dealing room for the sale of rare books, magazines, and other items related to science fiction.

A number of prizes are awarded at the convention, most notably the Seiun Award for the best science fiction of the year as voted by attendees of the convention.

Outside Japan, the Nihon SF Taikai is most famous for the animation for the opening ceremonies of Daicon III and IV Opening Animations, which was produced by the animators that later became Gainax. The DAICON IV opening video features a girl in a Playboy Bunny suit with cameos from many science fiction films and stories.

List of Taikai locations
 1962 - Tokyo - MEG-CON
 1963 - Tokyo - TOKON
 1964 - Osaka -  DAICON
 1965 - Tokyo -  TOKON 2
 1966 - Nagoya -  MEICON
 1967 - Tokyo -  TOKON 3
 1968 - Tokyo -  TOKON 4
 1969 - Kumamoto-ken -  KYUKON
 1970 - Tokyo -  TOKON 5
 1971 - Osaka -  DAICON 2
 1972 - Nagoya -  MEICON 2
 1973 - Hokkaidō -  EZOCON
 1974 - Kyoto -  MIYACON
 1975 - Kobe -  SHINCON
 1976 - Tokyo -  TOKON 6
 1977 - Yokohama -  HINCON
 1978 - Kanagawa-ken -  ASHINOCON
 1979 - Nagoya -  MEICON 3
 1980 - Tokyo -  TOKON 7
 1981 - Osaka - DAICON 3
 1982 - Tokyo -  TOKON 8
 1983 - Osaka - DAICON 4
 1984 - Hokkaidō -  EZOCON 2
 1985 - Niigata-ken -  GATACON Special Summer Fest
 1986 - Osaka -  DAICON 5
 1987 - Ishikawa-ken -  URACON '87
 1988 - Gunma-ken -  MiG-CON
 1989 - Nagoya -  DAINA CON EX
 1990 - Tokyo -  TOKON 9
 1991 - Kanazawa -  i-CON
 1992 - Yokohama -  HAMACON
 1993 - Osaka -  DAICON 6
 1994 - Okinawa -  RYUCON
 1995 - Shizuoka (Hamamatsu) -  はまなこん (Hamanacon)
 1996 - Kitakyushu -  コクラノミコン (Kokuranomicon)
 1997 - Hiroshima -  あきこん (Akicon)
 1998 - Nagoya (Mars) -  CAPRICON 1
 1999 - Nagano-ken -  やねこん (Yanecon)
 2000 - Yokohama -  Zero-CON
 2001 - Makuhari Messe, Chiba -  SF2001 
 2002 - Tamayu, Shimane -  ゆ～こん (Yūcon)
 2003 - Shiobara, Tochigi -  T-con 2003
 2004 - Gifu -  G-CON
 2005 - Yokohama -  HAMACON 2
 2006 - Matsushima - みちのくSF祭ずんこん (Michinoku SF Matsuri Zuncon)
 2007 - Yokohama - Nippon2007 65th World Science Fiction Convention
 2008 - Osaka - DAICON 7
 2009 - Shiobara, Tochigi - T-con 2009
 2010 - Edogawa, Tokyo -  TOKON 10
 2011 - Shizuoka - DONBURACON-L
 2012 - Yūbari, Hokkaidō - VARICON
 2013 - Hiroshima - KOICON
 2014 - Tsukuba, Ibaraki - NUTS-CON
 2015 - Yonago, Tottori - COMECON
 2016 - Toba, Mie - ISESHIMACON
 2017 - Shizuoka - DONBURACON-LL
 2018 - Minakami - JURACON
 2019 - Saitama - Sci-con
 2020 - Kōriyama, Fukushima - F-CON (postponed to 2022 due to the COVID-19 pandemic)
 2021 - Takamatsu, Kagawa - SF60

External links
 Official Nihon SF Taikai homepage in Japanese

Science fiction conventions in Asia
Recurring events established in 1962
1962 establishments in Japan
Japanese science fiction